is a Japanese late night variety show starring idol group Hinatazaka46. It is the successor to Hiragana Oshi and also hosted by the comedy duo Audrey. The show airs every Monday at 1:05 AM JST on TV Tokyo.

History 
On April 8, 2019, Hiragana Oshi was rebranded as Hinatazaka de Aimashō, following the rebranding of Hiragana Keyakizaka46 to Hinatazaka46 in March 2019. Hinatazaka de Aimashō also airs in a larger area than the previous show. The title is a reference to the real Hyūgazaka street in Minato, Tokyo, which can be alternately read as Hinatazaka, after which the group was named.

The show is mostly recorded in the studio, but several location shootings have been carried out as well, mostly for the "hit prayer" challenges traditionally taken on by Sakamichi Series groups for each music release. These include Lake Biwa in Shiga Prefecture for the second single's dragon boat rowing challenge, Miura Peninsula in Kanagawa Prefecture for the first album's tilefish catching challenge, and various locations in Miyazaki Prefecture to commemorate the show's syndication in the prefecture.

Due to the COVID-19 pandemic, starting from the episode aired on May 17, 2020, the program transitioned from recording in a studio to recording remotely via Zoom. The remote episodes consisted of discussions of notable scenes from previous episodes and a three-part Academic Ability Test, the group's first one since their rebranding and second one overall. It returned to studio recording, with various health precautions, since the episode aired on July 18, 2020.

The first set of home media was released on January 1, 2023. As with Hiragana Oshi, the episodes were released with a certain theme on each edition instead of in chronological order.

Reception 
Gendai Business commented that Hinatazaka de Aimashō is "funnier" than the usual idol variety shows, while idol journalist Yutaka Sato commented in Entame Next that the show "deviated" at times from the idol show formula to that of comedy shows, particularly noting the late 2020 episodes featuring comedian Takushi Tanaka. Sato attributed this to the Hinatazaka46 members' "greed" for laughter, a trait normally possessed by comedians; Wakabayashi and Kasuga have commented that some segments would be challenging even for experienced comedians. The interaction between the members and Audrey is also positively received, as well as the quality of post-production work.

In addition to the members' growth, pop culture writer Hiko commented that the show also documents the growth of the Audrey duo. Both of them had the reputation of being "shy" around women, and their connection with the members through the years had allowed them to "redo their youth", as they went from being bachelors when Hiragana Oshi started in 2018 to having daughters of their own as of 2022.

The September 2020 issue of B.L.T. magazine has the show as its feature story and named Shiho Katō, Kumi Sasaki, Suzuka Tomita, and Konoka Matsuda as Hinatazaka46's "comedy elites".

Notable guests 
 Kenji Hamatani (Hamaka-n), episodes 11-13, 33-34, 147-149
 Mitsuharu Sato (Dokidoki Camp), episodes 14-15,25,30,44,74 etc. (Total 12times)
 Shunji Kōno, Governor of Miyazaki Prefecture, episode 30
 Takushi Tanaka (Ungirls), episodes 87–89, 97–98
 Takashi Yoshimura (Heisei Nobushi Kobushi), episode 124

Home media

References

External links 

  

Hinatazaka46
2019 Japanese television series debuts
TV Tokyo original programming
Japanese variety television shows